Devario ostreographus is a species of danio endemic to India.

References

 

Devario
Fish described in 1839